The Aerocar Mini-IMP (Independently Made Plane) is a light aircraft designed by Moulton Taylor and marketed for homebuilding by Aerocar International. It is a scaled-down derivative of his original Aerocar IMP design. A two-seat version called the Bullet was also built. The Mini-IMP follows the same unconventional layout as its larger predecessor, with a center mounted engine, long driveshaft to a tail propeller, and inverted-V rudder/elevators.

The aircraft is available in the form of plans for amateur construction. Following Taylor's death, the plans and licensing for the Mini-IMP have been marketed by the Mini-IMP Aircraft Company of Weatherford, Texas.

Design and development
The aircraft features a cantilever high-wing, a single-seat enclosed cockpit, fixed or retractable tricycle landing gear or conventional landing gear and a single engine in pusher configuration.

The aircraft is made from riveted aluminum sheet. Its  span wing is mounted well behind the pilot and employs a NASA GA(PC)-1 airfoil. The engine is mounted behind the pilot's seat driving the propeller through an extension shaft. Engines used include the   Volkswagen air-cooled engine four-stroke.

Taylor claimed the Mini-IMP was not an original design, but an updated version of the 1912 Edison Doladay Bullet, a design that was capable of 110 mph in the earliest days of flight.

In the late 1970s inquiries were made concerning a military version of the Mini-IMP, skinned with Kevlar, armed with two 7.62-millimeter machine guns, and with room in the baggage compartment for a considerable quantity of ammunition. Nothing came of the proposal.

Specifications (typical Mini-IMP)

See also
Related development:
Holcomb Perigee
IMP
Micro-IMP

References

External links

Homebuilt aircraft
Single-engined pusher aircraft
1970s United States civil utility aircraft
Mini-IMP
High-wing aircraft